Contemplation is a type of prayer or meditation.

Contemplation or Contemplator may also refer to:
 Speculative reason
Contemplation (short story collection), by Franz Kafka
"Contemplations" (poem), a poem by Anne Bradstreet
"Contemplate" (song), a 2017 song by Savoy and Grabbitz
 Contemplation (EP), a Mike Garson album
Contemplations, a series of exercises in the Amitayurdhyana Sutra
Contemplator (Marvel Comics), a comic book character
Contemplate (pop duo), Romanian musical duo
Christian contemplation (contemplatio)